Chersodromus is a genus of snakes in the family Colubridae. The genus is endemic to Mexico.

Species
The genus Chersodromus contains four species which are recognized as being valid.
Chersodromus australis 
Chersodromus liebmanni  - Liebmann's earth runner
Chersodromus nigrum 
Chersodromus rubriventris  - redbelly earth runner

Nota bene: A binomial authority in parentheses indicates that the species was originally described in a genus other than Chersodromus.

Etymology
The specific name, liebmanni, is in honor of Danish botanist Frederik Michael Liebmann.

References

Further reading
Reinhardt J (1861). "Herpetologiske Meddelelser. II. Beskrivelser af nogle nye til Calamariernes Familie henhörende Slanger ". Videnskabelige Meddelelser fra den naturhistoriske Forening i Kjöbenhavn 22: 229–246. (Chersodromus, new genus, pp. 242–243; C. liebmanni, new species, pp. 243–245). (in Danish and Latin).

Chersodromus
Snake genera
Taxa named by Johannes Theodor Reinhardt